Lobophytum prostratum is a species of soft corals in the family Alcyoniidae and the genus Lobophytum.

References 

Alcyoniidae
Animals described in 1983